Alipov is a Russian masculine surname, its feminine counterpart is Alipova. It may refer to
Aleksandr Alipov (born 1948), Russian sports shooter
Alexey Alipov (born 1975), Russian sports shooter, son of Aleksandr
Yuliya Alipova (born 1977), Belarusian-born Russian sport shooter, wife of Alexey
Yulia Alipova (Miss Russia) (born 1990), Russian model 

Russian-language surnames